Consultation and Reconciliation Commission is a Yemeni governmental body formed by President Abdrabbo Mansour Hadi on 7 April 2022. The commission's goal is to support the Presidential Leadership Council and work to unify the objectives of the various national forces and components.

Membership 
The commission is composed of fifty members led by Mohammed al-Ghaithi, head of the Southern Transitional Council's foreign affairs department; and vice-chairpersons Abdulmalik al-Mikhlafi, Sakhr Al-Wajeeh, Jamilah Ali Rajaa and Akram al-Amiri.

On an invitation from the head of the Presidential Leadership Council, the body elected its executive presidency from among its members in its first session.

See also 

 Presidential Leadership Council

References 

Government of Yemen
2022 establishments in Yemen
Presidential Leadership Council